The EMD SW1500 is a  Diesel-electric locomotive intended for switching service and built by General Motors' Electro-Motive Division from 1966 to 1974. The SW1500 replaced the SW1200 in the EMD product line. Many railroads regularly used SW1500s for road freight service.

It is similar in appearance to the EMD SW1000 model which has a different engine and has one exhaust stack while the SW1500 has two.

Original Owners

See also 
List of GM-EMD locomotives

References

External links 
 

B-B locomotives
Diesel-electric locomotives of the United States
SW1500
Railway locomotives introduced in 1966
Standard gauge locomotives of the United States
Shunting locomotives